Kirk Shaw (born May 23, 1956) is a Canadian-born producer who founded Insight Film Studios in 1990. From 2006 to 2009 Insight Film Studios was Canada's largest independent production house.
Through Insight Shaw has produced more than 100 often award-winning films, including Helen, a 2009 drama starring Ashley Judd that won a Leo Award in 2009 for Best Supporting Performance by a Female in a Feature Length Drama and was also nominated for Best Feature Length Drama.

Shaw was part of the production team for the 2008 project, The Hurt Locker, directed by Kathryn Bigelow and starring Guy Pearce, Ralph Fiennes and Evangeline Lilly, which reached international acclaim  at the 82nd Academy Awards. It was nominated for nine Oscars including Best Picture and won six including  Best Director for Bigelow, the first woman to win this award. The film earned numerous awards and honours from critics' organizations, festivals and groups, including six BAFTA Awards, and was also nominated for three Golden Globes in 2010.

Shaw also produced such notable films such as Battle in Seattle in 2007, directed by Stuart Townsend and starring Charlize Theron, Woody Harrelson and Joshua Jackson; the 2008 film Kill Switch with Steven Seagal; and two popular TV series: Blood Ties and Painkiller Jane.

Insight Film Studios generated $500 million in film and television projects from 2005 to 2008.

In February 2012, Kirk Shaw joined Odyssey Media as a film and television content producer/packager.

Career

Early career
Shaw completed a journalism diploma at Douglas College in BC with the initial intent of becoming a writer. He landed on the administrative side of journalism, and was part of the management that launched the tabloid Edmonton Sun in 1978. Upon his return to Vancouver in the mid-1980s, Shaw spent 12 years in the computer business before launching Insight Films.

Producer
Shaw initially launched Insight Films to produce self-guided audio tours for museums and branched into video after he was approached by the Museum of Vancouver to produce display videos.

In 1994, Shaw began to produce his own documentaries, with Insight's first dramatic feature film released in 2001, Maximum Surge.

From 2006 to 2009 Kirk Shaw's Insight Film Studios was Canada's largest independent production house.

Shaw has been deemed an unfair engager by the Writers Guild of Canada.

In 2012, Shaw announced his appointment to Vancouver-based, Odyssey Media Inc. as an Executive Consultant and Producer.  Odyssey Media Inc. opened its doors in 2011 with offices in Vancouver BC, LA and in Brisbane Australia as Odyssey Film Studios  In Shaw's own words, "I'm very excited to be joining Odyssey.  The entertainment industry is in the midst of a great transformation and Odyssey Media is perfectly positioned to lead the change.  I know I can tailor cast, funding sources and filming locations around the globe to match the unique requirements of a variety of feature films Odyssey currently has in the works, as well as, bring my projects to Odyssey by leveraging short-term funding to back pay-or-play deals for actors, cash-flow prep and to confidently secure optimum distribution value."

In 2012, Shaw and Odyssey Media packaged and produced their first film together, Absolute Deception, an action/thriller starring Academy Award Winner Cuba Gooding Jr.
Kirk also helped kickstart his son, Christos Shaw's acting career.

In January 2013, Odyssey announced new investor funding for a 15-film slate of films 

In June 2013, Odyssey Media/Odyssey Film Studios and Kirk Shaw Executive Produced the Feature Film Drive Hard starring John Cusack and Thomas Jane.  Hard Drive was filmed throughout Australia's Gold Coast.

For 2014 Odyssey Media and Kirk Shaw packaged and produced Pound of Flesh starring Jean-Claude Van Damme. Shot in China for worldwide release in 2015.

In 2015, with close to 200 film and television credits to his name, Shaw is one of the leading film financiers and producers.

Awards

Awards for Kirk Shaw

Awards for Films in which the Production Team included Kirk Shaw

References

1956 births
Living people
Canadian film producers